Picture This is the debut studio album by Irish alternative band Picture This, released on 25 August 2017, by Republic Records. The album peaked at number 1 on the Irish charts and was certified platinum.

Track listing

Charts

Weekly charts

Year-end charts

Certifications

References

2017 debut albums
Picture This (band) albums
Republic Records albums
Albums produced by Jacquire King